Black eagle (Ictinaetus malayensis) is a bird of prey.

Black Eagle may also refer to:
Verreaux's eagle (Aquila verreauxii), an African bird of prey, also called the black eagle

Arts and entertainment
 The Black Eagle, a 1946 Italian adventure film 
 Black Eagle (1948 film), a Western film
 Black Eagle (1988 film), an American action film 
 R2B: Return to Base, also known as Black Eagle, a 2012 South Korean film
 Black Eagle, a fictional character in Davy Crockett and the River Pirates (1956) 
 Black Eagle, a fictional character in Wild Cards
 "Black Eagle", a song by Janet Jackson from the 2015 album Unbreakable
 Black Eagles, a 1970s reggae band featuring Denroy Morgan
 "The Black Eagle", a sketch from Monty Python's Flying Circus

Military
 Black Eagle (tank), a Russian prototype 
 Black Eagles aerobatic team, of the Republic of Korea Air Force
 Chengdu J-20 Black Eagle, a Chinese fighter aircraft 
 Operation Black Eagle, a military operation in Iraq in 2007
 Order of the Black Eagle, the highest order of chivalry in Prussia
 The Black Eagles, a series of Colombian drug trafficking paramilitary organizations

People
 Black Eagle (lacrosse) (fl. 1904), a Native American lacrosse player
 Chief Black Eagle, alias of Dwight York (born 1945), Nuwaubian leader and convicted criminal
 Wahweveh (Black Eagle) (died 1879), a leader of the Oregon Walpapi Paiute 
 Hubert Julian (1897–1983), Trinidadian aviator known as the Black Eagle

Places
 Black Eagle, Montana, U.S.
 Black Eagle, West Virginia, U.S.
 Black Eagle Dam, on the Missouri River, Montana, U.S.

Sport
 Black Eagles, nickname of the German national Australian rules football team
 Black Eagles, nickname of Beşiktaş J.K., a Turkish football club

Other uses
 Black Eagle (Montreal), a Canadian gay bar
 Black Eagle (prison), in Russia
 Black Eagle Brewery, in London, England
 Black Eagle Party, a Mexican masonic lodge
 , a ship
 Arrano beltza (Basque, 'black eagle'), a Navarre and Basque nationalist symbol

See also

Order of the Black Eagle (disambiguation)
Eagle (heraldry)
Double-headed eagle
 Treaty of the Three Black Eagles
 Pitchfork uprising, also known as Black Eagle Uprising, 1920